Oliver William Scholfield (born September 11, 1993) is a Canadian field hockey player who plays as a forward for the Vancouver Hawks and the Canadian national team.

International career
Scholfield represented Canada at the 2018 World Cup, where he played all four games. In June 2019, he was selected in the Canada squad for the 2019 Pan American Games. They won the silver medal as they lost 5–2 to Argentina in the final.

In June 2021, Scholfield was named to Canada's 2020 Summer Olympics team.

References

External links
 
 
 
 

1993 births
Living people
Field hockey players from Toronto
Canadian male field hockey players
Male field hockey forwards
2018 Men's Hockey World Cup players
Field hockey players at the 2019 Pan American Games
Pan American Games silver medalists for Canada
Pan American Games medalists in field hockey
Medalists at the 2019 Pan American Games
Sportspeople from Scarborough, Toronto
Olympic field hockey players of Canada
Field hockey players at the 2020 Summer Olympics
20th-century Canadian people
21st-century Canadian people